During the 1996–97 English football season, Reading F.C. competed in the Football League First Division.

Season summary

The 1996–97 season was another struggle for Reading, but they managed to secure survival on 12 April 1997, after beating promotion-chasing Wolves 2–1 at Elm Park.

Squad

Left club during season

Transfers

In

Loans In

Out

Loans out

Released

Competitions

First Division

Results

League table

FA Cup

League Cup

Squad statistics

Appearances and goals

|-
|colspan="14"|Players away on loan:
|-
|colspan="14"|Players who appeared for Reading but left during the season:

|}

Goal Scorers

Clean sheets

Disciplinary record

Notes

References

Soccerbase.com

Reading F.C. seasons
Reading